Nicholas Darnell may refer to:

 Nicholas Henry Darnell (1807–1885), American politician in Tennessee and Texas
 Nicholas Darnell (cricketer) (1817–1892), English cricketer, barrister and Catholic priest